Hoseyn Nahaz (also Romanized as Ḩoseyn Nāḥaz̤) is a village in Seyyed Abbas Rural District, Shavur District, Shush County, Khuzestan Province, Iran. At the 2006 census, its population was 208, in 31 families.

References 

Populated places in Shush County